Donald B. Elliott (born October 18, 1931) is a retired pharmacist and American politician of the Republican Party in the State of Maryland, USA, who served from 1986 to 2015 as a member of the Maryland House of Delegates.  He served as the representative of Maryland legislative district 4B, which encompasses Carroll and Frederick Counties in Western Maryland.  Delegate Elliott was known for his dedication to health care issues, particularly the crisis in Maryland regarding uncompensated care, and worked in later years to address the issue of removing citizens from the uninsured rolls through various measures.

Background
Elliott was first elected to the Maryland House of Delegates in 1986 to represent District 4B, which covers Carroll and Frederick Counties.  He originally defeated Republican incumbent Delegate Lanny V. Harchenhorn, and defeated Democrat Robert George Fehle Sr. in the general election. He sat on the House Health & Government Operations Committee as the ranking minority member, and also on two subcommittees; the House Insurance Subcommittee and the House Health Facilities & Occupations Subcommittee.

Education
Elliott attended Kenwood High School in Baltimore County.  He graduated from the University of Maryland School of Pharmacy in 1957. He later attended St. John's University, New York, to continue his study of pharmaceutical chemistry.

Career
Elliott served in the United States Navy and remained in the Naval Reserve until 1971, retiring at the rank of Lt. Commander.  Delegate Elliott has worked as a pharmacist in several capacities, including owning & operating two pharmacies in Carroll County, and remains a registered pharmacist.

During his time in the legislature, Elliott had concentrated his efforts on the Health & Government Operations Committee towards reforming Maryland's health insurance market.

Delegate Elliott introduced legislation in the 2008 session centering on personal responsibility with regards to health insurance. This legislation encompassed one piece of the noted Massachusetts health care reform.  The personal responsibility concept has been endorsed by former Massachusetts Governor Mitt Romney, and also former U.S. Speaker of the House Newt Gingrich.

During the 2010 session of the Maryland General Assembly, he attempted to eliminate the requirement to have all vehicles in Maryland have front license plates.  The Maryland Department of Legislative Services Estimated this would have saved the state over $500,000 the first year alone, with savings of over $750,000 in subsequent years.

Elliott officially retired from politics and the Maryland Legislature in January 2015.

Legislative notes
voted against the Clean Indoor Air Act of 2007 (HB359) 
voted for income tax reduction in 1998 (SB750) 
 voted against in-state tuition for illegal immigrants in 2007 (HB6)

Election results

2006 election for Maryland House of Delegates – District 4B
Voters to choose one:
{| class="wikitable"
|-
!Name
!Votes
!Percent
!Outcome
|-
|- 
|Donald B. Elliott, Rep.
|10,148
|  69.8%
|   Won
|-
|-
|-
|Timothy Schlauch, Dem.
|4,374
|  30.1%
|   Lost
|-
|Other Write-Ins
|12
|  0.1%
|   Lost
|}

2002 election for Maryland House of Delegates – District 4B
Voters to choose one:
{| class="wikitable"
|-
!Name
!Votes
!Percent
!Outcome
|-
|- 
|Donald B. Elliott, Rep.
|10,321
|  75.7%
|   Won
|-
|-
|Thomas Henry Morrison, Dem.
|7,399
|  15.9%
|   Lost
|-
|Other Write-Ins
|14
|  0.1%
|   Lost
|}

1998 election for Maryland House of Delegates – District 4B
Voters to choose one:
{| class="wikitable"
|-
!Name
!Votes
!Percent
!Outcome
|-
|- 
|Donald B. Elliott, Rep.
|6,897
|  67%
|   Won
|-
|-
|-
|Ann M. Ballard, Dem.
|3,452
|  33%
|   Lost
|-
|}

1994 election for Maryland House of Delegates – District 4B
Voters to choose one:
{| class="wikitable"
|-
!Name
!Votes
!Percent
!Outcome
|-
|- 
|Donald B. Elliott, Rep.
|7,403
|  78%
|   Won
|-
|-
|-
|Roy Pfeiffer, Dem.
|2,050
|  22%
|   Lost
|}

1990 election for Maryland House of Delegates – District 4B
Voters to choose one:
{| class="wikitable"
|-
!Name
!Votes
!Percent
!Outcome
|-
|- 
|Donald B. Elliott, Rep.
|6,061
|  69%
|   Won
|-
|-
|-
|William D. Henley Sr., Dem.
|2,695
|  31%
|   Lost
|}

1986 election for Maryland House of Delegates – District 4B
Voters to choose one:
{| class="wikitable"
|-
!Name
!Votes
!Percent
!Outcome
|-
|- 
|Donald B. Elliott, Rep.
|5,295
|  72%
|   Won
|-
|-
|-
|Robert George Fehle Sr., Dem.
|2,018
|  27%
|   Lost
|}

References and notes

External links
http://www.msa.md.gov/msa/mdmanual/06hse/html/msa12218.html

Republican Party members of the Maryland House of Delegates
1931 births
Politicians from Baltimore
Living people
American pharmacists
21st-century American politicians